Walt Disney Presents is an interactive gallery exhibit located in Animation Courtyard at Disney's Hollywood Studios featuring memorabilia from the Disney archives. The gallery displays artifacts from Walt Disney's life and from the history of the company he founded from his birth in 1901 through the company's vision for the future. In addition, the attraction includes a 15 minute short film of Walt Disney's life that explores the extraordinary hardships he overcame, as well as previously unseen footage, including Walt talking about the creation of Mickey Mouse.

The short film was originally hosted by Michael Eisner, but after he stepped down as CEO of the Walt Disney Company, Julie Andrews became the narrator for the short film. It opened on October 1, 2001, as Walt Disney: One Man's Dream for Walt Disney World's 100 Years of Magic celebration. Among the artifacts on display are a model of Main Street, U.S.A. from Disneyland, an Academy Award for 20,000 Leagues Under the Sea, the original Abraham Lincoln audio-animatronic from Great Moments with Mr. Lincoln and a model of The Twilight Zone Tower of Terror.

Occasionally, the short film will be preempted, and the theater will instead showcase sneak peeks of upcoming Disney film releases. The gallery has additionally featured upcoming attractions to Disney's Hollywood Studios, including a full model of Toy Story Land, a model of a building for Star Wars: Galaxy's Edge and artwork for Mickey & Minnie's Runaway Railway. It currently displays a model of Disney Cruise Line's upcoming ship, the Disney Wish.

External links

References 

Disney's Hollywood Studios
Walt Disney Parks and Resorts attractions
Animation Courtyard
Audio-Animatronic attractions
2001 establishments in Florida
Works about Walt Disney